Double skin milk is a Cantonese dessert made of milk, egg whites, and sugar. It originated from Shunde, Guangdong. It is a velvety smooth milk custard somewhat resembling panna cotta, with two skins. The first skin is formed during cooling of the boiled milk and the second when cooling the cooked custard. Traditionally, buffalo milk is used; its higher fat content compared to cow's milk produces a smooth texture. The usage of milk from the swamp buffalo in China is unusual because of the low yield of milk as compared with that of cows and river buffalo used in the rest of the world. This dessert is particularly popular in Shunde, Guangzhou, Shenzhen, Macau, and Hong Kong.

History
Double skin milk originated in the Daliang, Shunde in Guangdong. It is said to have been created by Grandma Dong in Qing Dynasty in Shunde. At that time, there was no refrigeration and the temperature was always high in Guangdong. Cowherd Grandma Dong found difficulties in storing milk. In one experiment, she boiled the milk and found a skin formed on the milk after cooling it down. The skin was surprisingly delicious. Hence, she started to sell milk with skin in her store and the products became popular in the neighborhood. However, milk with skin tended to spill easily during transportation. To solve this problem, Grandma Dong added egg white to the milk, which allowed the milk to curdle after boiling. After several improvements, contemporary double skin milk developed, with Grandma Dong credited as the originator. Nowadays, the skills used in making double skin milk are listed as part of Shunde's intangible cultural heritage.

The double skin milk has kept its popularity for a long time under such a competitive market for traditional food in China. Under the impact of fashion trends, the traditional double skin milk is constantly innovated while its traditional essence is retained. According to Grandma Dong, the exhibition they built has not only popularized not only the culture and origin of double skin milk, but also its amazing flavor.

Ingredient 
Double skin milk is made up with approximately three cups of whole milk, two egg whites, and three spoons of table sugar.

* Percent Daily Values are based on a 2,000 calorie diet. Your daily values may be higher or lower depending on your calorie needs.

** Nutrient information is not available for all ingredients. Amount is based on available nutrient data.

(-) Information is not currently available for this nutrient. If you are following a medically restrictive diet, please consult your doctor or registered dietitian before preparing this recipe for personal consumption.

Powered by the ESHA Research Database © 2018, ESHA Research, Inc. All Rights Reserved

Nutritive value 

 Double skin milk is rich in protein, which balances potassium sodium, eliminates edema, boosts immunity, lowers blood pressure, buffers anemia, and is conducive to growth.

 Double skin milk is rich in calcium, which is helpful to bone development. It helps human bodies to regulate enzyme activity, which allows bodies to participate in nerve activity, muscle activity, and neurotransmitter release. It also helps human bodies to regulate hormone secretion and heart rate. It also reduces cardiovascular permeability, eliminates inflammation and edema, and balances acid-base in human bodies.

 Double skin milk is rich in lactose, which makes calcium easily absorbed by the body.

Recipe 

 Heat milk in a microwave for 1 minute, let cool for 1 minute, then heat again for 1 minute.
 Leave the milk to cool for 5 minutes until visible skin forms on top of the liquid surface.
 Gently lift the milk skin with a knife and slowly pour the milk underneath into another bowl. Be sure to leave around ¼ of the milk inside to prevent the skin from sticking to the bowl.
 Add sugar into the milk that has been poured out. Mix to combine until the sugar has completely dissolved in the milk.
 Add ¼ cup of egg whites or the whites from 2 eggs into the milk mixture. Mix to combine thoroughly.
 Add the milk mixture back into the original bowl. Be sure to pour the mixture on the side of the bowl so the milk skin will float up to the top.
 Steam the milk for around 20 minutes. Be sure to cover the bowl with plastic wrap to maintain the smooth surface of the milk custard.
 Check to see if the milk is firm on its surface. Let the milk custard cool for 10 minutes.
 Add your topping of choice and enjoy.

Documentary clip 
Double-skin milk has been included in the documentary, A Bite of Shunde, in its 2nd episode. A Bite of Shunde is a cuisine documentary, filmed by the direction team of A Bite of China in 2016. It records numerous famous and delicious dishes in Shunde. In the 2nd episode of A Bite of Shunde, at 00:7:00-00:08:11, the documentary reveals the recipes and cooking process of this dessert, and grants the title of “Proud of Shunde.

Award 

 Provincial Intangible Cultural Heritage Authentic Double Skin Milk (2018)
 Regional Intangible Cultural Heritage Authentic Double Skin Milk (2013）
 Guangdong Time-Honored Brand (2018）
 Guangdong Lingnan Special Cuisine (2010)
 Foshan Dishes
 The most distinctive local food award
 The 7th Oscar Cate Peagant nominations
 Foshan Top Ten Snacks
 Phoenix City Sign Dim sum

Famous dessert shops for double skin milk

Hong Kong 

 Australian Dairy Company
 Yee Shun Milk Company
 Chung So Dessert
 Honeymoon Dessert
 Lucky Dessert

Macau 

 Yee Shun Milk Company

Guangzhou 

 Nanxin Milk Desserts Experts

Shunde, Foshan City 

 Renxin Laopu
 Minxin-Since 1930
 Huangji Milk Milk 
 Old Neighborhood Ginger Milk Curd 
 Aunt Zhou Milk 
 Nanxin Double Skin Milk
 Xiguan Childe in Second Double Skin Milk
 Daliang Double Skin Milk

Development and Inheritance

Double skin milk and milk tea 
In 2022 March, the fourth generation inheritor of Minxin, Zhanzhong Liang launched the newest product of double skin milk, Double Skin Milk Milk Tea. This is the newest product of his new dessert brand, Milk Forest, which is a name including the color of buffalo milk, the original ingredient of double-skin milk, and the brand tenet of being natural and original. The logo of the brand is also in the shape of a blue-and-white porcelain bowl, the container of double-skin milk, to inherit the artisan spirit of the old brand, Minxin. The Chief Brand Officer, of Foshan Minxin Catering Service Co., LTD, Shuyun Deng, mentions that "Innovation, is the inherited life of double skin milk from past until now". She states that double skin milk the creation of innovation from the past generation. While the youth gradually become the main consumers in the market and their demand and requirement of consumption become more important, Liang states that it is important to create a new form to attract the new generation and promote health-consuming trends. In the world of the Z era, milk tea has become an important of life for the young generation. With the same Minxin double-skin milk-producing method of steaming milk for more than 1 hour, Liang launches a new product, double-skin milk tea, by combining milk tea with double-skin milk. Recently, mango pomelo sago favor, matcha red bean flavor, and brown sugar bubble flavor are the most popular flavors in the shops, with more than 300 bottles of sales per day.

Double skin milk and KFC 
In 2021 November, KFC jointly launched the new desserts with a Chinese Time-honored brand Taojuju, K Double Skin Milk.

Double skin milk inheritance 
An activity for primary school students to learn the skill of intangible cultural heritage in Guangzhou Intangible Cultural Heritage Inheritance Base, Jiucheng Academy, under the leadership of the third-generation inheritor of He Thirteen Double Skin Milk, He Zhilian. He introduces the meaning behind the name of double skin milk and presents the skills of producing this dessert in the activity. Students and teachers are able to learn and cook the dessert by themselves in the event. 

A series of short videos, Little Cantonese Chef, is launched by The Department of Human Resources and Social Welfare of Guangdong Province cooperated with Shunde Vocational and Technical College, Guangdong Light Industry Technician College, and Guangdong Culinary Technical School during International Children's Day. The first episode of the series, The Capital of World Cuisine-Shunde, is showing students how to produce a double-skin milk.

Double skin milk museum 
Minxin·Since 1930 establishes the Double Skin Milk Museum at 1 Huagaili street in Dalian. This museum includes an experiential catering format, which allows the visitors to experience the production process of double-skin milk while having a taste of this dessert.

Double skin milk powder 
Nowadays, the homemade double skin milk has developed into packaged products which we can see in the supermarkets as it becomes more and more popular.

Double Skin milk Powder Brand Ranking:

 ZhanYi Baking
 GuangXi
 Doking

Double skin milk topping

There are creative cooking methods of double skin milk that increase the diversity of its flavor. People like to add different topping on the final product, for example, sweet ormosia, tapioca pudding, honey, fruit like mangos and so on.

See also
 Milk skin
List of Chinese desserts
Dairy product
List of sweet puddings

References

Chinese desserts
Custard desserts
Cantonese cuisine
Dairy products